The 52nd Golden Bell Awards (Mandarin:第52屆金鐘獎) was held on September 30, 2017 at the Sun Yat-sen Memorial Hall in Taipei, Taiwan. The ceremony was televised by Sanlih E-Television. Mickey Huang and Selina Jen hosted the ceremony.

Winners and nominees
Below is the list of winners and nominees for the main categories.

References

External links
 Official website of the 52nd Golden Bell Awards 

2017
2017 television awards
2017 in Taiwan